Taste receptor type 1 member 2 is a protein that in humans is encoded by the TAS1R2 gene.

The sweet taste receptor is predominantly formed as a dimer of T1R2 and T1R3 by which different organisms sense this taste. In songbirds, however, the T1R2 monomer does not exist, and they sense the sweet taste through the umami taste receptor (T1R1 and T1R3) as a result of an evolutionary change that it has undergone.

Structure 

The protein encoded by the TAS1R2 gene is a G protein-coupled receptor with seven trans-membrane domains and is a component of the heterodimeric amino acid taste receptor T1R2+3. This receptor is formed as a dimer of the TAS1R2 and TAS1R3 proteins. Moreover, the TAS1R2 protein is not functional without formation of the 2+3 heterodimer. 
Another interesting quality of these receptors expressed by TAS1R2 and TAS1R1 genes, is their spontaneous activity in the absence of the extracellular domains and binding ligands. This may mean that the extracellular domain regulates function of the receptor by preventing spontaneous action as well as binding to activating ligands such as sucrose.

Ligands 

The TAS1R2+3 receptor has been shown to respond to natural sugars sucrose and fructose, and to the artificial sweeteners saccharin, acesulfame potassium, dulcin, and guanidinoacetic acid.  Research initially suggested that rat receptors did not respond to many other natural and artificial sugars, such as glucose and aspartame, leading to the conclusion that there must be more than one type of sweet taste receptor. Contradictory evidence, however, suggested that cells expressing the human TAS1R2+3 receptor showed sensitivity to both aspartame and glucose but cells expressing the rat TAS1R2+3 receptor were only slightly activated by glucose and showed no aspartame activation. These results are inconclusive about the existence of another sweet taste receptor, but show that the TAS1R2+3 receptors are responsible for a wide variety of different sweet tastes.

Signal transduction 

TAS1R2 and TAS1R1 receptors have been shown to bind to G proteins, most often the gustducin Gα subunit, although a gusducin knock-out has shown small residual activity. TAS1R2 and TAS1R1 have also been shown to activate Gαo and Gαi protein subunits. This suggests that TAS1R1 and TAS1R2 are G protein-coupled receptors that inhibit adenylyl cyclases to decrease cyclic guanosine monophosphate (cGMP) levels in taste receptors. 
Research done by creating knock-outs of common channels activated by sensory G-protein second messenger systems has also shown a connection between sweet taste perception and the phosphatidylinositol (PIP2) pathway.  The nonselective cation Transient Receptor Potential channel TRPM5 has been shown to correlate with both umami and sweet taste.  Also, the phospholipase PLCβ2 was shown to similarly correlate with umami and sweet taste.  This suggests that activation of the G-protein pathway and subsequent activation of PLC β2 and the TRPM5 channel in these taste cells functions to activate the cell.

Location and innervation 

TAS1R2+3 expressing cells are found in circumvallate papillae and foliate papillae near the back of the tongue and palate taste receptor cells in the roof of the mouth.  These cells are shown to synapse upon the chorda tympani and glossopharyngeal nerves to send their signals to the brain.
TAS1R and TAS2R (bitter) channels are not expressed together in taste buds.

See also
 Taste receptor
 TAS1R1
 TAS1R3

References

Further reading

External links
 TAS1R2 Gene
 TASTE RECEPTOR TYPE 1, MEMBER 2; TAS1R2

Human taste receptors